Francesco Acerbi  (born 10 February 1988) is an Italian professional footballer who plays as a centre-back for  club Inter Milan, on loan from Lazio. He represents the Italy national team.

Until the age of 22, Acerbi played only in the lower tiers of Italian football, before being purchased by the Serie B club Reggina, where he established himself as a starting lineup defender. In 2011, Acerbi signed with Chievo Verona, thus making his Serie A debut. Despite being used only sporadically, Acerbi managed to draw the attention of A.C. Milan, who signed him the next summer. Having appeared in just 10 games for the rossoneri, Acerbi was sent back on loan to Chievo to complete the season. In 2013, he signed with Sassuolo, promoted to the Serie A for the first time in the club's history. During his debut season for the club he was diagnosed with testicular cancer and successfully cured by the end of campaign, which paved the way for his return to the pitch in September 2014. In 2018, having made 173 appearances in all competitions for the neroverdi, Acerbi transferred to Lazio, where he continued to be a starting defender.

An Italian international since 2014, he has played for the national team on three occasions in friendly games before making his competitive debut in 2019, later taking part in his nation's victorious UEFA Euro 2020 campaign.

Club career

Pavia
Born in Vizzolo Predabissi, Lombardy, Acerbi started his career at Lombard team Pavia, making his league debut on 23 April 2006. He was then loaned to Serie D team Renate on 11 January 2007 and played a club friendly on the same day. He made his official debut on 28 January in a 0–0 draw with Palazzolo. He returned to Pavia on 30 January and played in the last round of 2006–07 Serie C2.

On 2 August, Acerbi was loaned to Triestina then to Spezia on 16 August, though he only played for the latter's primavera under-20 team. He returned to Pavia on 1 July and became a regular in the first-team. He played both legs of 2009–10 Lega Pro Seconda Divisione promotion playoffs and finished as losing semi-finalists. The team was promoted after some teams were expelled from the league due to financial problems.

Reggina
Acerbi received a call-up to the pre-season camp of Serie B team Reggina on 13 July and the co-ownership deal completed on 16 July. On 31 January 2011, Pavia sold the remain 50 percent registration rights to Reggina for an undisclosed fee, whereupon the Calabrian side formed another co-ownership deal with Serie A team Genoa for €1 million. Acerbi only missed two games in 2010–11 Serie B and played both legs of promotion playoffs, losing to eventual playoff winners Novara in the semi-final. He played once during the 2010–11 Coppa Italia, a match he was ultimately sent off in. He was suspended in the next cup match and was not included in the third round.

Chievo
On 24 June 2011, Genoa purchased the remaining 50 percent of Acerbi's registration rights from Reggina for €2.2 million and sent Antonino Ragusa the other direction. On 1 July 2011, Acerbi was sold to Chievo in a co-ownership deal for €2 million as part of the deal that saw Kévin Constant transferred to Genoa for €7.8 million, with Ivan Fatić also returning to Chievo for €200,000 in June 2011. Acerbi entered the starting XI in the second half of the season making 14 starts, partnering with Marco Andreolli in nine games, Dario Dainelli three games and Boštjan Cesar two games.

Milan

On 20 June 2012, Milan bought Chievo's 50 percent share of Acerbi, with Genoa retaining the remaining half of his registration rights. Co-currently, Milan signed Kévin Constant in temporary loan deal from Genoa. In July 2012, Isaac Cofie joined Chievo from Genoa as part of financial compensation. Genoa revealed in the financial report of 2012 calendar year that Genoa repurchased 50 percent of the registration rights to Acerbi for €3.75 million and subsequently sold them to Milan for €4 million, whilst Cofie cost Chievo €1.5 million. The deals effectively made Genoa a profit of €250,000, whilst Chievo received new compensation for Constant's price tag.

Acerbi debuted for Milan in its 3–1 win over Bologna, though he failed to gain a stable place in starting line-up and left the club during the winter transfer window.

In 2019, Acerbi revealed that during his time in Milan he suffered from depression, grieving the death of his father, and often relied on alcohol to quell his emotional pain.

Genoa and Chievo
On 26 January 2013, Milan purchased 50 percent of the rights of Kévin Constant for €4 million. Acerbi, as a part of the deal, moved to Genoa also for €4 million, from where his previous club Chievo loaned him back for a €300,000 fee. He made seven appearances in the second half of 2012–13 Serie A.

Sassuolo
On 9 July 2013, Sassuolo, recently promoted to the Serie A, purchased half of Acerbi's playing rights for a €1.8 million fee. another remained a propriety of Genoa. During a pre-season medical, unusual blood tests revealed a testicular tumour, having surgery to remove the tumour. Soon after having the tumour removed, he resumed training with his new teammates. Acerbi had taken part in 13 games of the 2013–14 Serie A season before he failed a doping test in December 2013; he denied using any banned performance-enhancing drugs, and that it was due to irregular hormone levels caused by the return of the cancer. He subsequently underwent chemotherapy from 7 January to 14 March 2014. It was also reported that Acerbi did not miss the majority of training sessions during his cancer treatment period. Despite this, his return to the pitch was postponed until the next season.

In June 2014, the co-ownership deal was renewed by Sassuolo.

On 30 January 2015, Sassuolo purchased Acerbi outright for an additional €1.8 million fee. On the same day Genoa acquired Lorenzo Ariaudo and Leonardo Pavoletti from Sassuolo on temporary deals for free.

Lazio
On 11 July 2018, Acerbi joined Lazio on a five-year contract. He was set to catch up to the record of 162 consecutive Serie A appearances by an outfield player, held by Javier Zanetti. However, Acerbi's own personal record was stopped at 149 games due to a two-yellow-card suspension on 20 January 2019. His personal run started on 18 October 2015, when he was still a Sassuolo player.

Loan to Inter
On 1 September 2022, Acerbi moved on loan to Inter Milan.

International career
Acerbi has been capped once for the Italy under-20 Lega Pro representative team at the first match of 2008–09 Mirop Cup, losing to Hungary.

On 10 August 2012, Acerbi received his first senior team call-up from Cesare Prandelli. He made his senior debut for Italy under Antonio Conte, on 18 November 2014, in a 1–0 friendly win over Albania in Genoa, playing the full 90 minutes.

He played his first competitive match for Italy under Roberto Mancini, on 8 September 2019, in a 2–1 away win over Finland in a Euro 2020 qualifier. His first senior goal for Italy came on 15 November, in a 3–0 away win over Bosnia and Herzegovina, in a Euro 2020 qualifier.

In June 2021, he was included in Italy's squad for UEFA Euro 2020. In Italy's second group match against Switzerland in Rome on 16 June, Acerbi made his first appearance of the tournament, coming on for the injured Giorgio Chiellini in the first half of an eventual 3–0 victory, which allowed his side to advance to the knock-out stages. On 26 June, he started and assisted the match-winning goal, scored by Matteo Pessina, in extra-time of a 2–1 win over Austria in the round of 16. On 11 July, Acerbi won the European Championship with Italy following a 3–2 penalty shoot-out victory over England at Wembley Stadium in the final, after a 1–1 draw in extra-time.

Style of play
A hard-tackling and physically imposing left-footed defender, with good technique and ball-playing ability on the ground, Acerbi is considered to be one of the best Serie A and Italian defenders in circulation. He often plays as a left–sided centre-back in either a three or four–man back–line, and is known for his defensive consistency, charismatic personality, and leadership as a footballer, as well as his ability to carry the ball out from the back. A tall and physically powerful centre-back, although he lacks significant pace, his strength, reading of the game, and timing allows him to excel in physical duels with his opponents, while his height and heading ability also make him effective in winning aerial challenges, and also allow him to contribute offensively to his team with additional goals.

Career statistics

Club

International

Scores and results list Italy's goal tally first, score column indicates score after each Acerbi goal.

Honours
Lazio
Coppa Italia: 2018–19
Supercoppa Italiana: 2019
Inter Milan

 Supercoppa Italiana: 2022

Italy
UEFA European Championship: 2020
UEFA Nations League third place: 2020–21

Individual
Pallone d'Argento: 2014–15

Orders
 5th Class / Knight: Cavaliere Ordine al Merito della Repubblica Italiana: 2021

References

External links

 Reggina Calcio Profile 
 
 Football.it Profile 
 Lega Serie A Profile 
 Lega Serie B Profile 
 FIGC Profile 

1988 births
Living people
People from Vizzolo Predabissi
Italian footballers
Italy international footballers
Association football defenders
F.C. Pavia players
A.C. Renate players
Spezia Calcio players
Reggina 1914 players
Genoa C.F.C. players
A.C. ChievoVerona players
A.C. Milan players
U.S. Sassuolo Calcio players
S.S. Lazio players
Inter Milan players
Serie B players
Serie A players
UEFA Euro 2020 players
UEFA European Championship-winning players
Knights of the Order of Merit of the Italian Republic
Footballers from Lombardy
Sportspeople from the Metropolitan City of Milan